Golianovo (1920–1927 Lapáš Ďarmoty, 1927–1938, 1945–1948 Lapášské Ďarmoty) is a village and municipality in the Nitra District in western central Slovakia, in the Nitra Region.

History
In historical records the village was first mentioned in 1156.

Geography
The village lies at an altitude of 164 metres and covers an area of 10.702 km². It has a population of about 1500 people.

Ethnicity
The village is 99,27% Slovak, 0,60% Magyar and 0,13% Czechs.

Facilities
The village has a public library a gym and football pitch.

See also
 List of municipalities and towns in Slovakia

References

Genealogical resources

The records for genealogical research are available at the state archive "Statny Archiv in Nitra, Slovakia"

 Roman Catholic church records (births/marriages/deaths): 1701-1900 (parish B)
 Lutheran church records (births/marriages/deaths): 1887-1954 (parish B)

External links
https://web.archive.org/web/20071217080336/http://www.statistics.sk/mosmis/eng/run.html
Surnames of living people in Golianovo

Villages and municipalities in Nitra District